Juicio Final (1977) (Spanish for "Final Judgement" 1977) was a professional wrestling supercard show, scripted and produced by Consejo Mundial de Lucha Libre (CMLL), which took place on December 9, 1977, in Arena México, Mexico City, Mexico. The show served as the year-end finale for CMLL before Arena México, CMLL's main venue, closed down for the winter for renovations and to host Circo Atayde. The shows replaced the regular Super Viernes ("Super Friday") shows held by CMLL since the mid-1930s.

For the 1977 Juicio Final main event the teams of El Faraón/Ringo Mendoza and Joe Palardy/Perro Aguayo faced off in a Lucha de Apuestas with all four wrestlers' hair on the line. Faraón and Mendoza won the match, leading to Palardy and Aguayo having all their hair shaved off afterwards. In the semi-main event match Ultraman and Fishman wrestled to a double count out in a match for the Mexican National Welterweight Championship. The show featured four additional matches.

Production

Background
For decades Arena México, the main venue of the Mexican professional wrestling promotion Consejo Mundial de Lucha Libre (CMLL), would close down in early December and remain closed into either January or February to allow for renovations as well as letting Circo Atayde occupy the space over the holidays. As a result, CMLL usually held a "end of the year" supercard show on the first or second Friday of December in lieu of their normal Super Viernes show. The first year when CMLL used the name "El Juicio Final" ("The Final Judgement") for their year-end supershow was 1955. It is no longer an annually recurring show, but instead held intermittently, sometimes several years apart and not always in the same month of the year. All Juicio Final shows have been held in Arena México in Mexico City, Mexico which is CMLL's main venue, its "home".

Storylines
The 1977 Juicio Final show featured seven professional wrestling matches scripted by CMLL with some wrestlers involved in scripted feuds. The wrestlers portray either heels (referred to as rudos in Mexico, those that play the part of the "bad guys") or faces (técnicos in Mexico, the "good guy" characters) as they perform.

Results

References

1977 in Mexico
1977 in professional wrestling
CMLL Juicio Final
December 1977 events in Mexico
Events in Mexico City